Michael Carter (born May 7, 1999) is an American football running back for the New York Jets of the National Football League (NFL). He played college football at North Carolina.

Early life and high school
Carter grew up in Navarre, Florida and attended Navarre High School. He rushed for 526 yards and nine touchdowns before suffering a season-ending injury during the third game of his junior year. As a senior, Carter rushed for 2,536 yards and accumulated 3,345 all-purpose yards and 45 total touchdowns and was named the Florida Offensive Player of the Year by USA Today. Carter committed to play college football at North Carolina over offers from Florida, Louisville, Mississippi State and Tennessee.

College career
Carter rushed for 559 yards on 97 carries and eight touchdowns in his true freshman season. As a sophomore, Carter rushed 84 times for 597 yards and two touchdowns and caught 25 passes for 135 yards and a touchdown. During his junior season, he rushed for 1,003 yards and three touchdowns and had 21 receptions for 154 yards and two touchdowns and was named third-team All-Atlantic Coast Conference (ACC).

Carter was named to the Doak Walker Award and Paul Hornung Award watchlists going into his senior season. Carter was named the ACC Running Back of the week after rushing for 214 yards and two touchdowns against Virginia Tech on October 10, 2020. Against Miami, Michael Carter and fellow North Carolina running back Javonte Williams ran for a combined 544 rushing yards, the most by two running backs in college football history. Carter led the team in rushing in that game with 308 yards, along with two touchdowns. On December 21, 2020, Carter announced he would opt out of the Orange Bowl matchup with Texas A&M, in order to prepare for the 2021 NFL Draft, finishing his 2020 season with 1,245 rushing yards and 9 rushing touchdowns to go along with 267 receiving yards and two more scores. His 1,245 rushing yards are eighth-most in a single season for a Tar Heel running back. That same day, he and teammate Javonte Williams were named Pro Football Focus  first-team All-American for the running back position. Carter's 3,403 total rushing yards over his collegiate career are fourth best all-time for the school. He was also named a finalist for the 2020 Paul Hornung Award.

Professional career 

On May 1, 2021, Carter was selected by the New York Jets with 107th overall pick in the fourth round of the 2021 NFL Draft. Later that day, the Jets selected Michael Carter II with the 154th overall pick in the 5th round of the 2021 NFL draft from rival school Duke. He signed his four-year rookie contract with the Jets on June 4, 2021.

Carter made his first career start in Week 3 of his rookie season in 2021. He scored his first career touchdown in Week 4 in a 27–24 win over the Tennessee Titans. He suffered a high ankle sprain in Week 11 and was placed on injured reserve on November 27, 2021. He was activated on December 18. He finished his rookie season with 147 carries for 639 rushing yards and four rushing touchdowns to go along with 36 receptions for 325 receiving yards. He finished fourth among rookies in rushing yards in 2021.

References

External links
New York Jets bio
North Carolina Tar Heels bio

Living people
American football running backs
North Carolina Tar Heels football players
Players of American football from Florida
People from Santa Rosa County, Florida
1999 births
New York Jets players